Chiloglanis fasciatus, the Okavango suckermouth, is a species of upside-down catfish native to Angola, Botswana and Namibia where it is found in the Kwando River and the Okavango River and Delta.  This species grows to a length of  TL.

References

External links 

fasciatus
Catfish of Africa
Freshwater fish of Angola
Fish of Botswana
Freshwater fish of Namibia
Fish described in 1936